Cyril Douglas Hutchens CBE (19 February 1904 – 27 March 1982) was an Australian politician who represented the South Australian House of Assembly seat of Hindmarsh from 1950 to 1970 for the Labor Party.

He was Commissioner of Public Works in South Australia from 1965 to 1968.

In 1970 Hutchens retired from politics when his Hindmarsh seat was abolished, much of it moving into the new electoral area of Spence, for which Ernie Crimes was selected as the Labor candidate.

References

 

1904 births
1982 deaths
Members of the South Australian House of Assembly
Australian Labor Party members of the Parliament of South Australia
20th-century Australian politicians